The Magic Pan is a small American chain of fast-food and take-away creperies using the recipes of a now-closed chain of full-service restaurants that specialized in crêpes, popular in the early 1970s through early 1990s, which peaked at 110 Magic Pan locations throughout the United States and Canada.

History
The first Magic Pan was a small place on Fillmore Street in San Francisco established by Hungarian immigrants Lazlo and Paulette Fono. Later, they opened a larger place in Ghirardelli Square.
 
The Quaker Oats Company acquired Magic Pan from the Fonos in 1970, and it became the company's primary restaurant chain. Quaker Oats sold the company to an Oakland, California-based company, Bay Bottlers, in 1982.

In 2005, the Magic Pan name was re-introduced by Lettuce Entertain You Enterprises as a fast-food crepe stand in Northbrook, Illinois.  This resurrected version of Magic Pan does not have the crepe-making machine used in the original chain. Instead, it uses recreations of the original recipes.  The revived chain opened a second location in the food court of the Mall of America near Minneapolis, Minnesota.  The Paradies company currently operates Magic Pan in U.S. airports including Denver and Washington National.

Food
Among the menu items were chicken divan, "chicken elegante", crepe suzette, crêpes filled with spinach and mushroom soufflé, strawberries and sour cream, Chantilly cream, coffee chocolate sauce ice cream, and "cherry royale".

The restaurant designed an automated system to make crepes at a crepe station, consisting of a motorized conveyor that would heat metal pans.  An attendant would dip the bottom of the pans in the crepe batter, to ensure an even coating and then turn the pans upside down while placing them on the gas flame conveyor, so the thin crepes actually cook on the bottom of a clean greased pan that's facing upward. The ‘conveyor’ was a gas flame heated circular “wheel” about normal table height that slowly turned and held eight pans maximum at one time.

References

External links
- Magic Pan Alumni website on LinkedIn
  The Magic Pan Project - Magic Pan Employee Social Network

Restaurants established in 1964
Restaurant chains in the United States
1964 establishments in California
Companies based in San Francisco
Companies based in Oakland, California
Restaurants in the San Francisco Bay Area
Defunct restaurants in the San Francisco Bay Area